The LPGA of Korea Tour is a South Korean professional golf tour for women. LPGA stands for Ladies Professional Golf Association. LPGA of Korea runs this tour, not the American LPGA. It is one of the world's five leading women's golf tours.

Based on the April 2019 exchange rates, in 2019 the main tour has total prize fund of roughly 21.7 million USD.

Schedule

The 2019 schedule includes 29 events, 26 played in South Korea, and one each played Vietnam, Taiwan and China.

Historical tour schedules and results

Season money leaders

Source:

See also
Professional golf tours
Women's World Golf Rankings
Korean Tour

References

External links
 

 
Professional golf tours